Birth of Violence is the sixth studio album by American singer-songwriter Chelsea Wolfe. Announced on June 18, 2019, the first single, "The Mother Road", was released the same day. The second single, "American Darkness", was released on July 17.

The album was written and recorded in seclusion at her home in Northern California, with Wolfe describing it as having more of a "folk leaning sound" in an effort to return to her folk roots. It was released by Sargent House on September 13, 2019.

Accolades

Track listing

Personnel
Credits adapted from Discogs.

 Chelsea Wolfe - vocals, guitar, production
 Ben Chisholm - guitar, bass guitar, synthesizers, piano, mandolin, production, mixing
 Jess Gowrie - drums 
 Ezra Buchla - viola 
 Heba Kadry - mastering
 John Crawford - art direction, photography
 Nona Limmen - cover
 Cathy Pellow - management

Charts

References

Chelsea Wolfe albums
2019 albums
Music & Arts albums
Sargent House albums